"Cradle 2005" is a song recorded by English girl group Atomic Kitten from their compilation The Greatest Hits. It was released as a single on 14 February 2005, in aid of World Vision. It is a re-recorded version of a song that was previously included on their debut album, Right Now (2000). "Cradle" was released a year after the group's announcement of their split in 2004. "Cradle 2005" reached number 10 on the UK Singles Chart and number 46 in Ireland.

Music video
The 2005 version of the video is a montage of the Atomic Kitten's career and includes footage of Jenny Frost and Liz McClarnon visiting Africa for the charity fundraiser. Natasha Hamilton was unable to visit due to being heavily pregnant with her second child. The video also shows clips of the US version of the "Whole Again" video.

The 2000 version features Natasha Hamilton, Liz McClarnon and Kerry Katona behind a plain white and black background.

Track listings

Notes
  denotes additional producer

Charts

References

2000 singles
2000 songs
2005 singles
Atomic Kitten songs
Innocent Records singles
Songs written by Andy McCluskey
Virgin Records singles